West Australian Airways was an Australian airline based in Geraldton, Western Australia. Established on 5 December 1921 as Western Australian Airways by World War I pilot Norman Brearley, it was the first airline in Australia to establish a scheduled air service. The first service left Geraldton on 2 November 1922. On 12 June 1936, West Australian Airways was purchased by Adelaide Airways for £25,000. In July that year, it became part of Australian National Airways.

History

Following World War I, Norman Brearley, who had served with the Royal Flying Corps, returned to Australia in 1919. He brought with him two Avro 504J aircraft. In May 1921, the Federal Government advertised for tenders for a subsidised air-mail & passenger contract, operating a weekly service between Geraldton and Derby.  Brearley submitted multiple submissions and on 2 August 1921, was advised that one of his tenders had been accepted. Brearley then set about hiring 5 pilots; Val Abbott, Arthur Blake, Bob Fawcett, Charles Kingsford Smith and Leonard Taplin.

Brearley suspended flight operations until 21 February 1922.

On 3 December 1926, Western Australian Airways Ltd. changed its name to West Australian Airways Ltd., though for the majority of its existence it was usually referred to as simply Airways. On 2 July 1928, Australia's first interstate airmail contract, between Perth and Adelaide, was awarded to West Australian Airways, for 5 years. Services began on 26 May 1929. A hot luncheon was provided at Ceduna, dinner at the airline-owned hostel at Forrest and catering at Kalgoorlie.

On 19 April 1934, the Federal Government awarded the 5-year Perth – Daly Waters route contract to MacRobertson Miller Aviation Co. This decision left West Australian Airways with only the now unsubsidised Perth–Adelaide route. In April 1936, Adelaide Airways Ltd offered to purchase West Australian Airways and on 12 June the purchase was finalised for £25,000.  On 1 July, Adelaide Airways and West Australian Airways became part of the new Australian National Airways.

See also
List of defunct airlines of Australia
MacRobertson Miller Airlines

References

External links
 West Australian Airways 1921-1936 Australia's first airline: a pictorial history (compiled by Geoff Goodall):
 Part One - The North-West Service archived version
 Part Two - Transcontinental Air Service Perth-Adelaide - and the end of the airline archived version

Airlines established in 1921
Defunct airlines of Australia
Airlines disestablished in 1936
Airlines of Western Australia
1936 mergers and acquisitions
Australian companies established in 1921
1936 disestablishments in Australia